In mathematics, Sperner's lemma is a combinatorial result on colorings of triangulations, analogous to the Brouwer fixed point theorem, which is equivalent to it. It states that every Sperner coloring (described below) of a triangulation of an  simplex contains a cell whose vertices all have different colors.

The initial result of this kind was proved by Emanuel Sperner, in relation with proofs of invariance of domain.  Sperner colorings have been used for effective computation of fixed points and in root-finding algorithms, and are applied in fair division (cake cutting) algorithms. Finding a Sperner coloring or equivalently a Brouwer fixed point is now believed to be an intractable computational problem, even in the plane, in the general case. The problem is PPAD-complete, a complexity class invented by Christos Papadimitriou.

According to the Soviet Mathematical Encyclopaedia (ed. I.M. Vinogradov), a related 1929 theorem (of Knaster, Borsuk and Mazurkiewicz) had also become known as the Sperner lemma – this point is discussed in the English translation (ed. M. Hazewinkel). It is now commonly known as the Knaster–Kuratowski–Mazurkiewicz lemma.

Statement

One-dimensional case 

In one dimension, Sperner's Lemma can be regarded as a discrete version of the intermediate value theorem. In this case, it essentially says that if a discrete function takes only the values 0 and 1, begins at the value 0 and ends at the value 1, then it must switch values an odd number of times.

Two-dimensional case 
The two-dimensional case is the one referred to most frequently. It is stated as follows:

Subdivide a triangle  arbitrarily into a triangulation consisting of smaller triangles meeting edge to edge. 
Then a Sperner coloring of the triangulation is defined as an assignment of three colors to the vertices of the triangulation such that
 The vertices that lie along any edge of triangle  have only two colors, the two colors at the endpoints of the edge.
Then every Sperner coloring of every triangulation has at least one "rainbow triangle", a smaller triangle in the triangulation that has its vertices colored with all three different colors. More precisely, there must be an odd number of rainbow triangles.

Multidimensional case 
In the general case the lemma refers to a -dimensional simplex:

Consider any triangulation , a disjoint division of  into smaller -dimensional simplices, again meeting face-to-face. Denote the coloring function as:

A coloring function defines a Sperner coloring when:
 Vertices of  located on any -dimensional subface of the large simplex are colored only with the colors

Then every Sperner coloring has an odd number of simplices its triangulation, whose vertices are colored with all  colors. In particular, there must be at least one rainbow simplex.

Proof 

We shall first address the two-dimensional case. Consider a graph  built from the triangulation  as follows:

Two vertices are connected with an edge if their corresponding areas share a common border with one endpoint colored 1 and the other colored 2.

Note that on the interval  there is an odd number of borders colored 1-2 (simply because A is colored 1, B is colored 2; and as we move along , there must be an odd number of color changes in order to get different colors at the beginning and at the end). Therefore, the vertex of  corresponding to the outer area has an odd degree. But it is known (the handshaking lemma) that in a finite graph there is an even number of vertices with odd degree.

Thus we have obtained a slightly stronger conclusion, which says that in a triangulation  there is an odd number (and at least one) of full-colored triangles.

A multidimensional case can be proved by induction on the dimension of a simplex. We apply the same reasoning, as in the two-dimensional case, to conclude that in a -dimensional triangulation there is an odd number of full-colored simplices.

Commentary 

Here is an elaboration of the proof given previously, for a reader new to graph theory.

This diagram numbers the colors of the vertices of the example given previously.  The small triangles whose vertices all have different numbers are shaded in the graph.  Each small triangle becomes a node in the new graph derived from the triangulation.  The small letters identify the areas, eight inside the figure, and area  designates the space outside of it.

As described previously, those nodes that share an edge whose endpoints are numbered 1 and 2 are joined in the derived graph. For example, node  shares an edge with the outer area , and its vertices all have different numbers, so it is also shaded.  Node  is not shaded because two vertices have the same number, but it is joined to the outer area.

Generalizations

Subsets of labels 

For every sub-simplex, the set of labelings on its vertices is a set-family over the set of colors . This set-family can be seen as a hypergraph.

To illustrate, here are some balanced labeling examples for :

  - balanced by the weights .
  - balanced by the weights  .
  - balanced by the weights .
This was proved by Shapley in 1973. It is a combinatorial analogue of the KKMS lemma.

Polytopal variants 
Suppose that we have a -dimensional polytope  with  vertices.  is triangulated, and each vertex of the triangulation is labeled with a label from  Every main vertex  is labeled . A sub-simplex is called fully-labeled if it is -dimensional, and each of its  vertices has a different label. Some special cases are:

 . In this case,  is a simplex. The polytopal Sperner lemma guarantees that there is at least 1 fully-labeled simplex. That is, it reduces to Sperner's lemma.
 . Then, there are at least  sub-triangles in which three different labels are used.

The general statement was conjectured by Atanassov in 1996, who proved it for the case .  The proof of the general case was first given by de Loera, Peterson, and Su in 2002. They provide two proofs: the first is non-constructive and uses the notion of pebble sets; the second is constructive and is based on arguments of following paths in graphs.

Meunier extended the theorem from polytopes to polytopal bodies, which need not be convex or simply-connected. In particular, if  is a polytope, then the set of its faces is a polytopal body. In every Sperner labeling of a polytopal body with vertices , there are at least:

fully-labeled simplices such that any pair of these simplices receives two different labelings. Since the degree is at least , the lower bound is at least . But it can be larger. For example, for the cyclic polytope in 4 dimensions with  vertices, the lower bound is:

Musin further extended the theorem to -dimensional piecewise-linear manifolds, with or without a boundary.

Asada, Frick, Pisharody, Polevy, Stoner, Tsang and Wellner further exended the theorem to pseudomanifolds with boundary, and improved the lower bound on the number of facets with pairwise-distinct labels.

Cubic variants 
Suppose that, instead of a simplex triangulated into sub-simplices, we have an -dimensional cube partitioned into smaller -dimensional cubes.

Harold W. Kuhn proved the following lemma. Suppose the cube , for some integer , is partitioned into  unit cubes. Then there exists a unit cube with all the labels  (some of them more than once). Then there is a square labeled with 

Another variant, related to the Poincaré–Miranda theorem, is as follows. Suppose the cube  is partitioned into  unit cubes. Then there exists a unit cube in which all  labels are different.

Wolsey strengthened these two results by proving that the number of completely-labeled cubes is odd.

Musin extended these results to general quadrangulations.

Rainbow variants 
Suppose that, instead of a single labeling, we have  different Sperner labelings. We consider pairs (simplex, permutation) such that, the label of each vertex of the simplex is chosen from a different labeling (so for each simplex, there are  different pairs). Then there are at least  fully labeled pairs. This was proved by Ravindra Bapat for any triangulation. A simpler proof, which only works for specific triangulations, was presented later by Su.

Another way to state this lemma is as follows. Suppose there are  people, each of whom produces a different Sperner labeling of the same triangulation. Then, there exists a simplex, and a matching of the people to its vertices, such that each vertex is labeled by its owner differently (one person labels its vertex by 1, another person labels its vertex by 2, etc.). Moreover, there are at least  such matchings. This can be used to find an envy-free cake-cutting with connected pieces.

Asada, Frick, Pisharody, Polevy, Stoner, Tsang and Wellner extended this theorem to  pseudomanifolds with boundary.

Then:

Moreover, each label is used by at least one (out of ) labeling.

Both versions reduce to Sperner's lemma when , or when all  labelings are identical.

See  for similar generalizations.

Oriented variants

Brown and Cairns strengthened Sperner's lemma by considering the orientation of simplices. Each sub-simplex has an orientation that can be either +1 or -1 (if it is fully-labeled), or 0 (if it is not fully-labeled). They proved that the sum of all orientations of simplices is +1. In particular, this implies that there is an odd number of fully-labeled simplices.

Define the degree of the labeling as the number of switches from 1 to 2, minus the number of switches from 2 to 1. See examples in the table at the right. Note that the degree is the same if we count switches from 2 to 3 minus 3 to 2, or from 3 to 1 minus 1 to 3.

Musin proved that the number of fully labeled triangles is at least the degree of the labeling. In particular, if the degree is nonzero, then there exists at least one fully labeled triangle.

If a labeling satisfies the Sperner condition, then its degree is exactly 1: there are 1-2 and 2-1 switches only in the side between vertices 1 and 2, and the number of 1-2 switches must be one more than the number of 2-1 switches (when walking from vertex 1 to vertex 2). Therefore, the original Sperner lemma follows from Musin's theorem.

Trees and cycles 
There is a similar lemma about finite and infinite trees and cycles.

Related results 
Mirzakhani and Vondrak study a weaker variant of a Sperner labeling, in which the only requirement is that label i is not used on the face opposite to vertex i. They call it Sperner-admissible labeling. They show that there are Sperner-admissible labelings in which every cell contains at most 4 labels. They also prove an optimal lower bound on the number of cells that must have at least two different labels in each Sperner-admissible labeling. They also  prove that, for any Sperner-admissible partition of the regular simplex, the total area of the boundary between the parts is minimized by the Voronoi partition.

Applications 
Sperner colorings have been used for effective computation of fixed points. A Sperner coloring can be constructed such that fully labeled simplices correspond to fixed points of a given function. By making a triangulation smaller and smaller, one can show that the limit of the fully labeled simplices is exactly the fixed point. Hence, the technique provides a way to approximate fixed points.
A related application is the numerical detection of periodic orbits and symbolic dynamics. Sperner's lemma can also be used in root-finding algorithms and fair division algorithms; see Simmons–Su protocols. 

Sperner's lemma is one of the key ingredients of the proof of Monsky's theorem, that a square cannot be cut into an odd number of equal-area triangles.

Sperner's lemma can be used to find a competitive equilibrium in an exchange economy, although there are more efficient ways to find it.   

Fifty years after first publishing it, Sperner presented a survey on the development, influence and applications of his combinatorial lemma.

Equivalent results

See also 
Topological combinatorics

References

External links
 Proof of Sperner's Lemma at cut-the-knot
 Sperner's lemma and the Triangle Game, at the n-rich site.
Sperner's lemma in 2D, a web-based game at itch.io.

Combinatorics
Fixed points (mathematics)
Topology
Lemmas
Articles containing proofs
Fair division
Triangulation (geometry)